Japan competed in the 2016 Asian Beach Games in Danang, Vietnam from September 24 to October 5, 2016. The delegation was bannered by 54 athletes. Japan send their representatives in 7 sports including beach soccer, beach volleyball, beach handball, beach wrestling, vovinam, pétanque, and bodybuilding.

The Japanese beach soccer team won the gold medal, being the Japanese team's only gold medal in this game. Bodybuilding took home one silver and two bronze medals, followed by beach sambo which won one silver and one bronze. Beach wrestling won two bronze medals, while pétanque and vovinam bagged one bronze medal each.

Medallist

| width="56%" align="left" valign="top" |

|  style="text-align:left; width:22%; vertical-align:top;"|

Competitors

| width=78% align=left valign=top |
The following is the list of number of competitors participating in the Games.

Beach soccer

Result

Team
 Shingo Terukina Yusuke Kawai Shotaro Haraguchi Yuki Nakahara Naoya Matsuo Teruki Tabata Takaaki Oba Takuya Akaguma Takasuke Goto Ozu Moreira

Beach volleyball

Men's tournament

Women's tournament
Group Stage

Knockout Stage

Pétanque

Men
1. Shooting
Haruki Kato

2. Singles
Takayuki Watabe

3. Doubles
Hiroshi Katata
Yoshihiro Noda

Women
1. Shooting
Keiko Katata

2. Singles
Ayumi Goma 

3. Doubles
Akemi Kinoshita
Rieko Ujihara

Vovinam

References 

Nations at the 2016 Asian Beach Games
Japan at the Asian Beach Games
2016 in Japanese sport